A gender gap, a relative disparity between people of different genders, is reflected in a variety of sectors in many societies. There exist differences between men and women as reflected in social, political, intellectual, cultural, scientific or economic attainments or attitudes.

Examples of a gender gap include:

Gender pay gap, the average difference between the remuneration for men and women who are working, with women often paid less than men
Gender pay gap in Australia, a persistent and sometimes rising gender pay gap in Australia
Gender pay gap in India, difference in earnings between women and men in the paid employment and labor market in India
Gender pay gap in New Zealand, the difference in the median hourly wages of men and women in New Zealand
Gender pay gap in Russia, occupational segregation by gender and labor market discrimination in Russia, especially since 1991

Gender pay gap in the United States, ratio of female-to-male median or average earnings among full-time workers in the US
Gender pay gap in the United States tech industry, divergence in pay between men and women who work in areas such as software engineering
Gender pay gap in sports, unequal pay in sports, particularly for female athletes who do not receive equal revenue, depending on the sport
Gender gap in Pakistan, relative disparity between male & female citizens in Pakistan in terms of legal discrimination, economic inequality, and cultural attitudes
Gender gap in education, sex discrimination in the education system affecting both men and women during and after their educational experiences
Gender gaps in mathematics and reading, the finding that on average boys and men exceed in mathematics, while girls and women exceed in reading skills
Gender differences in suicide, different rates of completed suicides and suicidal behavior; women more often have suicidal thoughts, but men commit suicide more frequently
Wikipedia gender gap, the fact that Wikipedia contributors are mostly male, relatively few biographies are about women, and topics of interest to women are less well-covered
Voting gender gap in the United States, the difference in the percentage of men and women voting for a particular candidate in US elections
Digital Gender Gaps

Other uses 
Gender gap (linguistics), a typological convention used to promote gender-neutrality in German

See also
Gender inequality, the social process by which men and women are not treated as equals
Gender pension gap, the cumulative impact of the gender pay gap.
Global Gender Gap Report, an index, published by the World Economic Forum, designed to measure gender equality
BBC gender pay gap controversy, a series of incidents in 2017 and 2018 revealing a gender pay gap at the British Broadcasting Corporation
Gender binary, the classification of gender into two distinct forms, whether by social system or cultural belief

References

Gender equality
Gender and employment
Gender and education